Grinde is a village in Tysvær municipality in Rogaland county, Norway.  The village is located at the western end of the Grindafjorden, a couple of kilometers east of the villages of Aksdal and Førre.  Grinde lies along the European route E39-European route E134 highway.

History
Grinde was historically located in Skjold municipality. On 1 January 1965, Skjold municipality was dissolved and its territory dispersed between three municipalities. The districts Grinde, Dueland, and Yrkje with 1,133 inhabitants in total were merged into Tysvær.

References

Villages in Rogaland
Tysvær